Azarbon may refer to:
 Azarbon-e Olya
 Azarbon-e Sofla